Claudia Chender (born July 29, 1976) is a Canadian politician, and leader of the Nova Scotia New Democratic Party since June 25, 2022. She was first elected to the Nova Scotia House of Assembly in the 2017 general election, and re-elected in the 2021 general election. She represents the electoral district of Dartmouth South.

Leader of the NSNDP
After the 2021 election, party leader Gary Burrill appointed Chender as the House Leader. She returned to her role as the spokesperson for Justice and Status of Women as well as the critic for Economic Development and Natural Resources and Renewables.

Burrill announced – on November 9, 2021 – that he would resign as leader once a successor was chosen at a future convention. On February 14, 2022, Chender declared her candidacy to replace Burrill as leader of the Nova Scotia New Democratic Party (NSNDP). On May 21, 2022 registration closed for the leadership race, with Chender being the sole candidate.

She was confirmed as leader after a general membership vote on June 25, 2022. She is the third female leader of the NSNDP, with the previous female leaders being Alexa McDonough and Helen MacDonald; fourth leader, if interim leader Maureen MacDonald is included.

Early life and education
Chender is a lawyer by training and has worked in the not for profit and private sectors. She was raised in the Buddhist and Jewish traditions. She graduated from Dalhousie University in 1999 with a Bachelor of Arts and then from the University of Victoria in 2004 with a Bachelor of Laws. She lives in Dartmouth South with her husband and three children.

Electoral record

References

Canadian women lawyers
Dalhousie University alumni
Lawyers in Nova Scotia
Living people
Nova Scotia New Democratic Party MLAs
People from Dartmouth, Nova Scotia
University of Victoria Faculty of Law alumni
Women MLAs in Nova Scotia
21st-century Canadian politicians
21st-century Canadian women politicians
1977 births
Leaders of the Nova Scotia CCF/NDP
Female Canadian political party leaders